Air vice-marshal (abbreviated as AVM) is the third highest active rank of the Royal Australian Air Force and was created as a direct equivalent of the British Royal Air Force rank of air vice-marshal.  It is also considered a two-star rank.  The Australian Air Corps adopted the RAF rank system on 9 November 1920 and this usage was continued by its successor, the Royal Australian Air Force.

Air vice-marshal is a higher rank than air commodore and is a lower rank than air marshal. Air vice-marshal is a direct equivalent of rear admiral in the Royal Australian Navy and major general in the Australian Army.

The insignia is one light blue band (on a slightly wider black band) over a light blue band on a black broad band.

The equivalent rank in the Women's Auxiliary Australian Air Force, was 'air chief commandant'.

See also

Air force officer rank insignia
Australian Defence Force ranks and insignia
Ranks of the RAAF

References

Royal Australian Air Force
Military ranks of Australia
Air force ranks